Littlehales is a surname. Notable people with the surname include:

Alf Littlehales (1867–1942), British footballer 
Charles Littlehales (1871–1945), British cricketer
Dylan Littlehales (born 1999), Australian paracanoeist
George W. Littlehales (1860-1943), American naval officer
Harry Littlehales (1901–1989), British footballer
Richard Littlehales (born 1931-2014), British florist by Royal appointment